The Foulridge Tunnel is a canal tunnel on the Leeds and Liverpool Canal in Foulridge, Lancashire. The tunnel is the longest in the country to allow passage of canoes and kayaks.

Background
The building of the Leeds and Liverpool Canal began in 1770, but work on the over-budget project was suspended during the American Revolutionary War. Before work on the canal resumed with Robert Whitworth as engineer, he re-surveyed the route and recommended changes to improve the available water supply.

Construction
Construction of the tunnel began in December 1792, following Whitworth's 1789 survey. The project lasted almost five years; the final three years saw construction of the final  of tunnel.

Only  of the tunnel's length—approximately two fifths—was built by the standard method of sinking shafts and boring horizontally. The majority of the tunnel was made using the cut and cover method, where the hill was excavated and the tunnel lining constructed before the hill excavation was infilled.

Once the tunnel was complete the canal opened to Colne Road in Burnley in 1796, where it would take another five years to complete the large embankment needed to cross the valley there.

Operational history
After the tunnel's opening in May 1796, the Leeds Intelligencer described the tunnel as "the most complete work of the kind in England, if not in Europe".

A local story purports that on 24 September 1912, a cow fell into the canal at Blue Slate Farm, Colne, near the southern portal. She then swam the length of the tunnel before being helped out and revived with brandy (or rum) at the Hole in the Wall pub in Foulridge.

Having no towpath, vessels traditionally navigated the tunnel by legging while the horses traversed above the tunnel. This practice ended at Foulridge in 1886 after the drowning of a legger; a double-ended steam tug was introduced in 1880 to haul vessels through and return without winding. A diesel tug later replaced the steam boat; this service ended in 1937. To ensure that boats would not meet head-on in the tunnel, a telephone system was installed to control passage. In 1963, this was superseded by traffic lights.

In 2017, the Canal & River Trust allowed unpowered craft such as canoes and kayaks to use the tunnel.

See also

Listed buildings in Foulridge
Listed buildings in Colne

Footnote

References

Grade II listed buildings in Lancashire
Buildings and structures in the Borough of Pendle
Canal tunnels in England